Manouchehr Parchami-Araghi (born 12 October 1952) is an Iranian water polo player. He competed in the men's tournament at the 1976 Summer Olympics.

References

1952 births
Living people
Iranian male water polo players
Olympic water polo players of Iran
Water polo players at the 1976 Summer Olympics
Place of birth missing (living people)
20th-century Iranian people